The Nissan Be-1 is a retro-styled two-door notchback sedan manufactured by Nissan for model years 1987-1988, and originally marketed solely in Japan at their Nissan Cherry Stores.

Designed to be a fashionable city car, the Be-1 was marketed without any Nissan branding, by reservation only, and solely in Japan. Nissan's own design team made a dsign proposal (A), while industrial designer Naoki Sakai and an unnamed Italian design studio also provided proposals (B1 and B2). Sakai's B1 design was chosen, and with it, the name as well.

Because of its origins at the Pike Factory, Nissan's special project group, the Be-1—along with the Nissan Figaro, Pao and S-Cargo—are known as Nissan's "Pike cars." It, the Pao, and the Figaro are built on the Nissan March's underpinnings.

In 2011, noted design critic Phil Patton, writing for the New York Times, called the Pike cars "the height of postmodernism" and "unabashedly retro, promiscuously combining elements of the Citroën 2CV, Renault 4, Mini [and] Fiat 500."

Specifications 
Like the later Pao and Figaro, the Be-1 is based on the first generation Nissan Micra chassis. As such, it is powered by the 1.0 L (987 cc) carbureted MA10S I4 engine coupled to a choice of a 3-speed automatic or 5-speed manual transmission.

The chassis included rack and pinion steering, independent suspension with struts in front, as well as 4-links and coil springs in back. Disc brakes were used in the front  A large, electronically operated canvas roof was offered as an option  The interior is very basic and notably features a large, centrally mounted speedometer. Like the original Mini, the Be-1 has a small bootlid (although it opens upwards) and a fixed rear window and is thus a two-door sedan. Nissan themselves has sometimes classified the car as a "coupé".

Production 
10,000 Be-1s were built in total from 1987-1988, but since demand was so high for the Be-1, buyers were decided through a lottery organized by Nissan. The cars were assembled, partially by hand, by contract manufacturers . Takada later also built the Pao and Figaro, as well as some small-series Isuzu and Subaru products.

The Be-1 was available in 4 colors: Pumpkin Yellow, Tomato Red, Hydrangea Blue and Onion White. The Pumpkin Yellow Be-1 came with body-colored steel wheels with black hubcaps, the other colors came with white steel wheels with black hubcaps.

Model codes

 BK10RHF (5MT)
 BK10RHFW (5MT w/canvas top)
 BK10RHA (3AT)
 BK10RHAW (3AT w/canvas top)

Dimensions and weight
 Length: 
 Width: 
 Height: 1395 mm (w/canvas top 1420 mm)
 Wheelbase: 
 Ground clearance: 
 Front tread: 
 Rear tread: 
 Weight: MT 670 kg, (w/canvas top 680 kg), AT 700 (w/canvas top 710 kg)
 Gross weight: MT 945 kg (w/canvas top 955 kg), AT 975 kg (w/canvas top 985 kg)
 Capacity: 5 people

Performance
 Minimum turning radius: 
 Fuel consumption (according to Japanese rule 10.15): (5MT) 20.5 km/L (48.2 mpg); (3AT) 16.5 km/L (38.8 mpg); (3AT w/canvas top) 15.0 km/L (35.3 mpg)
 Fuel consumption at a steady : (5MT) 31.4 km/L (73.9 mpg); (3AT) 25.4 km/L (59.7 mpg)

Engine

 Water-cooled OHC inline-4-cylinder
 Bore x Stroke: 
 Compression ratio: 9.5
 Electronically controlled carburetor (ECC)

Other
 Fuel tank capacity: unleaded regular, 40 L (10.6 US gal)
 Disc brakes front 
 Tire size: 165/70R12 front and rear

References

External links

Catalog

Be-1
Retro-style automobiles
Cars introduced in 1987
Cars discontinued in 1988